KSRQ (90.1 FM, "Pioneer 90.1") is a 24,000-watt public radio station licensed to Northland Community & Technical College. The station serves the Thief River Falls, Minnesota area with rimshot coverage in Grand Forks, North Dakota.  It is a member of Minnesota's Ampers network.

Pioneer 90.1's daytime music mix is Triple-A. Overnights feature a deep tracks classic rock mix.

The station bills its 6 pm to midnight weeknight programming as "Pioneer 90.1 After Hours," featuring volunteer-hosted and syndicated programming. Weekends also feature a mix of volunteer-hosted and syndicated programs.

History  
10-watt KAVS-FM (89.5) signed on at the Thief River Falls Area Vocational School in 1971, three years after the school's radio announcing program was launched. Regularly-scheduled programming began in 1972.

A move to 90.1 FM and a power increase to 1,800 watts followed in 1977. The station's call letters changed to KSRQ in 1983. The station's transmitter was relocated to a taller tower and effective power was increased to 24,000 watts in 1989.

Starting around 2003, the station's management started recruiting community volunteer hosts. In August 2004, the station's format changed from daily segments of country, soft rock, and metal to adult album alternative as "Pioneer 90.1."

Digital broadcasting 
Digital broadcasts began in 2009, with the addition of an HD digital signal. Multi-casting of HD-2 and HD-3 signals began in December 2010.

KSRQ HD-2 is the Pioneer PolkaCast, featuring recordings from Minnesota and other Midwestern Polka bands.

KSRQ HD-3 is Neon 90, which features pop, rock, soul, and country music of the late 1950s through 1970s.

, Pioneer 90.1 is the only station in northwest Minnesota to offer HD Radio subchannels.

References

External links
Pioneer 90.1 KSRQ official website

Independent Public Radio
College radio stations in Minnesota
Thief River Falls, Minnesota
Radio stations established in 1971
1971 establishments in Minnesota